Institut d'informatique d'Auvergne (ISIMA, formerly Institut supérieur d'informatique, de modélisation et de leurs applications) a French engineering College created in 1993.

The school trains engineers in virtual reality, data science and computer security.

Located in Aubière, close to Clermont-Ferrand, the ISIMA is a public higher education institution. The school is a member of the Clermont Auvergne University.

References

External links
 ISIMA

Engineering universities and colleges in France
ISIMA
Clermont-Ferrand
Educational institutions established in 1993
1993 establishments in France